Dainik Gana Adhikar (Assamese: গণ অধিকাৰ) is an Assamese regional daily newspaper covering the state of Assam in North-East India. It is published from Guwahati. Gana Adhikar is owned by Unity Media & Infrastructure Limited. The newspaper started its journey as a fortnightly in 1994.

References

External links
Online edition
Gana Adhikar Assamese Newspaper

Assamese-language newspapers
Publications established in 1994
1994 establishments in Assam
Mass media in Guwahati